{{Speciesbox
| name = Ribbon orchid
| image = 
| image_caption = 
| genus = Tainia
| species  = trinervis
| authority = (Blume) Rchb.f.
| synonyms_ref = 
| synonyms =
 Mitopetalum trinerve <small>Blume</small>
 Dendrobium paucifolium Reinw. ex Blume
 Mitopetalum plicatum Blume
 Mitopetalum parviflorum Blume
 Mitopetalum rubescens Blume
 Mitopetalum trinervium Blume
 Tainia parviflora (Blume) Schltr.
}}Tainia trinervis, commonly known as the ribbon orchid, is an evergreen, terrestrial plant with crowded pseudobulbs, each with a single smooth, shiny leaf and up to fourteen greenish to yellowish flowers with red or purplish stripes in the middle. It is found in tropical Southeast Asia, New Guinea and northern Australia.

DescriptionTainia trinervis is an evergreen, terrestrial herb that has thin, crowded, dark green pseudobulbs. The petals are a similar size to the sepals but project forwards. The middle lobe has three purple ridges and a curved tip. The side lobes curve upwards. Flowering occurs from September to November.<

Taxonomy and naming
The ribbon orchid was first formally described in 1856 by Carl Ludwig Blume who gave it the name Mitopetalum trinerve and published the description in Museum Botanicum Lugduno-Batavum sive stirpium Exoticarum, Novarum vel Minus Cognitarum ex Vivis aut Siccis Brevis Expositio et Descriptio. In 1857, Heinrich Gustav Reichenbach changed the name to Tainia trinervis. The specific epithet (trinervis) is derived from the Latin prefix tri- meaning three  and nervus meaning "vein".

Distribution and habitatTainia trinervis'' grows in rainforest close to streams in tropical far north Queensland, New Guinea and the Maluku Islands.

References

trinervis
Plants described in 1856
Orchids of New Guinea
Orchids of Queensland